The Harry F. Wentz Studio, also known as the Harry F. Wentz Studio-Bungalow and Studio Neah-Kah-Nie, is a historic house located in the Neahkahnie community near Manzanita, Oregon, United States. Designed by artist Harry F. Wentz and architect A. E. Doyle and built circa 1916, this bungalow came to be regarded as a prototype of the Northwest Regional style of architecture. Some of the characteristic features of the house include: colors and materials associated with the Northwest, especially timber; low massing with simple wall surfaces; porches with slender wooden supports; and siting to harmonize with the surrounding landscape. The style was later more fully developed by John Yeon and Doyle's colleague Pietro Belluschi.

The house was added to the National Register of Historic Places in 1976.

See also
National Register of Historic Places listings in Tillamook County, Oregon

References

External links

Houses completed in 1916
National Register of Historic Places in Tillamook County, Oregon
Houses on the National Register of Historic Places in Oregon
Houses in Tillamook County, Oregon
1916 establishments in Oregon
A. E. Doyle buildings